Puerto Rico Highway 199 (PR-199) is a main highway, mostly divided, in San Juan, Puerto Rico and Guaynabo, Puerto Rico. It is one of the few highways in Puerto Rico with discontinuity, as there is also another Puerto Rico Highway 199 in Bayamón.

Route description

San Juan to Guaynabo
In San Juan, near Trujillo Alto, it begins near PR-850 and PR-181 and goes through the exclusive Paseos area, goes west, intersecting Puerto Rico Highway 1, Puerto Rico Highway 52 and Puerto Rico Highway 20. It approaches downtown Guaynabo. Several schools can be found along the way.

Bayamón
Puerto Rico Highway 199 begins again at Puerto Rico Highway 5 and ends near Puerto Rico Highway 167. The segment is likely to be renumbered as Puerto Rico Highway 5 since the latter is being built into a tollway to Naranjito and Comerío and it shows to be not probable that PR-199 in Guaynabo will be connected to this segment in Bayamón.

Major intersections

See also

 List of highways numbered 199

References

External links
 

199